Noah Carl is a British sociologist and intelligence researcher. He was investigated and subsequently dismissed from his position as a Toby Jackman Newton Trust Research Fellow at St Edmund's College, Cambridge after over 500 academics signed a letter repudiating his research and public stance on race and intelligence, calling it "ethically suspect and methodologically flawed", and stating their concern that "racist pseudoscience is being legitimised through association with the University of Cambridge." An investigation by the college concluded that Carl's work was "poor scholarship" which violated standards of academic integrity, and that Carl had collaborated with right-wing extremists. Some newspaper columnists criticised the decision to dismiss Carl as an attack on academic freedom. Others questioned whether St Edmund's had failed to properly vet him before he was hired in the first place.

Biography 
Carl received a BA in Human Sciences, an MSc in Sociology and a DPhil in Sociology from the University of Oxford. His DPhil thesis was titled Cognitive ability and socio-political beliefs and attitudes. Prior to his appointment to the St Edmund's College, Cambridge fellowship, Carl received media attention for papers on the link between artistic tastes and views on Brexit, the reasons why London pubs are disappearing, and a study for Adam Smith Institute which found that conservatives were heavily underrepresented among academics at British universities. Additionally, he was in the news for a study on the relationship between intelligence and trust in other members of society.

His work has been published in academic journals such as Intelligence, the Journal of Biosocial Science, the British Journal of Sociology. He is the second most prolific contributor to Open Quantitative Sociology & Political Science, an online journal that has been described in the New Statesman as a "pseudo-science factory-farm", and he has contributed to Mankind Quarterly, which is described as a white supremacist journal. According to an article in the New Statesman from February 2018, Carl had also published two papers on whether larger Muslim populations make terrorism more likely and one suggesting that British stereotypes about immigrants are "largely accurate". In relation to the latter article, the New Statesman quoted Dr. Niko Yiannakoulias of McMaster University as commenting: "It is never OK to publish research this bad, even in an inconsequential online journal."

Carl has spoken twice at the London Conference on Intelligence, a private conference on human intelligence at which some attendees presented papers on race and intelligence and eugenics. He was one of 15 attendees to collaborate on a letter defending the conference following media coverage. The letter was published in the journal Intelligence in September 2018.

Appointment controversy 
In December 2018, Carl was awarded the Toby Jackman Newton Trust Research Fellowship, a 3-year fellowship at St Edmund's College. More than 500 academics signed a letter opposing Carl's appointment to the  fellowship, stating their "deep concern" that "racist pseudoscience is being legitimised through association with the University of Cambridge." Clément Mouhot, one of the letter's organizers, was quoted in The Guardian as saying that Carl's work relied on "selective use of data and unsound statistical methods which have been used to legitimise racist stereotypes about groups". The St Edmund's Combination Room also produced a statement arguing that Carl's work "demonstrated poor scholarship, promoted extreme right-wing views and incited racial and religious hatred."

An internal investigation at St Edmund's concluded that Carl's work demonstrated "poor scholarship" and "did not comply with established criteria for research ethics and integrity", and that it fell outside the normal protections for academic free speech as a result. The investigation also found that Carl had "collaborated with a number of individuals who were known to hold extremist views", and that continuing his affiliation would risk allowing the college to be used to "promote views that could incite racial or religious hatred" and damage the reputation of the college. Carl was subsequently dismissed from his fellowship. A separate investigation into the appointment process itself found no irregularities in the process of recruiting Carl, but did recommend changes to future hiring procedures.

An editorial in The Times was critical of the decision to terminate Carl's post, arguing that his "main offence seems to have been to challenge the 'woke' left-wing orthodoxy". Opinion columnists in The Telegraph and The Spectator also criticised the decision.

Historian Evan Smith argued that the narrative advanced by Carl's defenders "has little basis in reality", and that it is rather these defenders who seek to stifle free speech by mobilizing a fear of "wokeness" in order to diffuse the power of student protest. Reaction from supporters of Carl's firing also focused on questioning whether St Edmund's had failed to properly vet him before he was hired in the first place. 

In June 2019, Noah Carl began crowdfunding a legal challenge to his dismissal. In September 2019 his $100,000 fundraising goal was reached. Varsity reported that this campaign was coordinated by a company created by a developer named Conner Douglass who had provided similar services to white nationalist Richard Spencer and other neo-Nazis involved in the 2017 "Unite the Right" rally in Charlottesville, Virginia.

In March 2021, Carl withdrew his claim; the case was settled by a confidential agreement between both parties.

References

External links
 
 Discussion of the appointment controversy from BBC Two's Politics Live, 10 May 2019

Living people
Academics of the University of Cambridge
Academics of the University of Oxford
Alumni of Nuffield College, Oxford
Alumni of St Hugh's College, Oxford
British sociologists
Fellows of St Edmund's College, Cambridge
Intelligence researchers
People from Cambridge
Race and intelligence controversy
1990 births